Sunil Philip Narine (born 26 May 1988) is a Trinidadian cricketer who plays internationally for the West Indies. He made his One Day International (ODI) debut in December 2011 and Test match debut in June 2012. Primarily an off-spin bowler, he is also a left-handed batsman.

He has played in Twenty20 (T20) franchise leagues around the world and played in over 300 T20 matches. As of 2021 he plays for Kolkata Knight Riders in the Indian Premier League (IPL) and Trinbago Knight Riders in the Caribbean Premier League (CPL).

Domestic and T20 franchise career
Sunil made his debut in first-class cricket for Trinidad and Tobago in February 2009 during the Regional Four Day Competition, bowling thirteen overs without taking a wicket. He did not play another first-class match until nearly a year later, and after going wicketless in the first innings claimed a double scalp in the second, that of tail-ender Lionel Baker.

On 20 January 2011, during the Caribbean Twenty20, Narine played his first Twenty20 (T20) match but did not bowl as the match was rained off before Trinidad and Tobago could bowl. In the end, Trinidad and Tobago won the competition and Narine managed five wickets at an average of 13.40. By virtue of winning the competition Trinidad and Tobago qualified for the 2011 Champions League Twenty20 held in September and October, in which Narine was one of three bowlers to take ten or more wickets. He made his List A debut on 20 October 2011 in the Regional Super50, claiming figures of one wicket for 35 runs (1/35); his wicket that of opening batsman Miles Bascombe. Trinidad and Tobago won the competition and Narine was the leading wicket-taker in the competition with 15 scalps, five more than the nearest competitor, fellow spin bowler Nikita Miller. Narine is the all-time leading wicket taker in Champions League T20 history with 39 scalps.

In May 2018, he was named as one of the ten marquee players for the first edition of the Global T20 Canada cricket tournament. On 3 June 2018, he was selected to play for the Montreal Tigers in the players' draft for the inaugural edition of the tournament.
In 2018 Indian Premier League he became the most valuable player, this was his second MVP award, after his debut season in 2012 Indian Premier League.

In October 2018, he was named in the squad for the Dhaka Dynamites team, following the draft for the 2018–19 Bangladesh Premier League. In March 2019, Narine played in his 100th match in the IPL.

In June 2019, he was selected to play for the Montreal Tigers franchise team in the 2019 Global T20 Canada tournament. In July 2020, he was named in the Trinbago Knight Riders squad for the 2020 Caribbean Premier League. In February 2021, during the 2020–21 Super50 Cup, Narine played in his 100th List A match.

In April 2022, he was bought by the Oval Invincibles for the 2022 season of The Hundred in England.

International career
When the West Indies toured India in November and December 2011 Narine was included in the squad. He made his One Day International debut in the third fixture on 6 December, taking the wickets of Virat Kohli and then Ravichandran Ashwin to help the West Indies to a 16-run victory. Playing in the final two matches (both won by India) Narine took one more wicket while conceding a further 87 runs.

Back in the Caribbean, Narine played three of T&T's six matches in February 2012 in the Regional Four Day Competition, taking 31 wickets at an average of 9.61, and finishing as the team's leading wicket-taker and seventh overall. Australia arrived in the West Indies in March, and their tour began with five ODIs. Narine and West Indies fast bowler Kemar Roach each finished with eleven wickets and were joined leading wicket takers in the series which was drawn 2–2 
.

Following an injury to fast bowler Kemar Roach, and the conclusion of the 2012 IPL, Narine was drafted into the West Indies squad for the third and final Test against England in June 2012. At the time he had played just six first-class matches, managing 34 wickets at an average of 11.88. Replacing fellow off spinner Shane Shillingford in the side, Narine made his Test debut on 10 June 2012.

A superb performance by Narine of five wickets for 28 runs on 16 July 2012 helped the West Indies beat New Zealand by 20 runs in their fifth and last ODI and win the current series 4–1 at Basseterre, St. Kitts. Playing only in his second Test he was adjudged the Man of the Match after he picked eight wickets which included his maiden five-wicket haul. Narine was left out of the first 2 tests vs New Zealand.

As on 8 March 2014 he topped the ICC Twenty20 rankings of bowlers with 784 points. Saeed Ajmal of Pakistan at second, was way behind in points at 714, while Ajantha Mendis of Sri Lanka with 674 points completed the top three.

He is the only bowler to have bowled a maiden in a Super Over in a Twenty20 match. He was left out of the 2021 ICC T20 CWC squad despite his good performance in IPL 2021, prompting several questions and reactions.

Bowling action
Narine has the reputation of a "mystery bowler", due to the variations that he has on his off breaks, and how he disguises them, but has been reported for a suspect bowling action on a number of occasions. He missed playing in the final of the 2014 Champions League Twenty20 after being suspended for an illegal action with his arm bent by more than 15 degrees and in November 2015 was suspended from bowling in international cricket. His action was reported during the third ODI game against Sri Lanka. In April 2016, he was cleared for bowling in all formats of domestic and international cricket.

Narine's action was again reported during the 2018 Pakistan Super League, but was cleared soon after. In 2020 it was reported yet again, this time during the 2020 Indian Premier League. It was cleared by the IPL Suspect Bowling Action Committee later in the season.

References

External links

Sunil Narine's profile page on Wisden
Sunil Narine Profile and latest news at Sportskeeda
Sunil Narine profile page on cplt20

1988 births
Living people
People from Arima
Trinidad and Tobago people of Indian descent
Sportspeople of Indian descent
West Indies Test cricketers
West Indies One Day International cricketers
West Indies Twenty20 International cricketers
Cricketers at the 2015 Cricket World Cup
Cape Cobras cricketers
Comilla Victorians cricketers
Dhaka Dominators cricketers
Guyana Amazon Warriors cricketers
Kolkata Knight Riders cricketers
Lahore Qalandars cricketers
Quetta Gladiators cricketers
Melbourne Renegades cricketers
Oval Invincibles cricketers
Sydney Sixers cricketers
Trinbago Knight Riders cricketers
Trinidad and Tobago cricketers